Pemberton  may refer to:

People
Pemberton (surname)

Places
Pemberton is the name of several places:

Australia
Pemberton, Queensland, a neighbourhood in Windemere in the Bundaberg Region
Pemberton, Western Australia

Canada
Pemberton, British Columbia
Pemberton Valley, a name for the valley along the Lillooet River in British Columbia that includes the community
Pemberton Volcanic Belt

United Kingdom
Pemberton, Greater Manchester, a residential area of Wigan
Pemberton (ward), an electoral ward of the Wigan Metropolitan Borough Council
Pemberton, Carmarthenshire

United States
Pemberton, Minnesota
Pemberton, New Jersey
Pemberton, Ohio
Pemberton Heights, New Jersey
Pemberton Mill, Lawrence, Massachusetts
Pemberton Point, Hull, Massachusetts
Pemberton Township, New Jersey

See also
Pemberton v. Tallahassee Memorial Regional Center
Pemberton Music Festival
Pemberton Festival